Kudarah as a place name may refer to:
 Kudarah (Alif Dhaal Atoll) (Republic of Maldives)
 Kudarah (Noonu Atoll) (Republic of Maldives)